Paul Edward Dehn (pronounced "Dain"; 5 November 1912 – 30 September 1976) was a British screenwriter, best known for Goldfinger, The Spy Who Came in from the Cold, Planet of the Apes sequels and Murder on the Orient Express. Dehn and his partner, James Bernard, won the Academy Award for Best Story for Seven Days to Noon.

Biography and work
Dehn was born in 1912 in Manchester, England. He was educated at Shrewsbury School, and attended Brasenose College, Oxford. While at Oxford, he contributed film reviews to weekly undergraduate papers. According to the British writer and former spy John Le Carre, Dehn worked in the Special Operations Executive (SOE) as an assassin during World War II.

He began his career in 1936 as a film reviewer for several London newspapers.  He was film critic for the News Chronicle until its closure in 1960 and then for the Daily Herald until 1963.

During World War II, he was stationed at Camp X in Ontario, Canada. This was one of several training facilities operated by the British Special Operations Executive to train spies and special forces teams. He was the Political Warfare officer from 1942 to 1944 and held the rank of Major. Dehn took part in missions in France and Norway.

He narrated the 1951 film Waters of Time and later wrote plays, operettas and musicals for the stage. He wrote the lyrics for songs in two films, Moulin Rouge (1952) and The Innocents (1961).

In 1949 or 1950, Dehn began a collaboration with composer James Bernard. Dehn asked Bernard to collaborate with him on the original story for the Boulting Brothers film Seven Days to Noon (1950).

Through the 1960s, Dehn concentrated on screenwriting for espionage films, including Goldfinger (1964), The Spy Who Came in from the Cold (1965), and The Deadly Affair (1967). He later wrote the screenplays for the second, third, and fourth original Planet of the Apes movies and received the story-by credit on the fifth. He wrote the libretto for William Walton's opera The Bear and two by Lennox Berkeley; A Dinner Engagement and Castaway.

His last screenplay was for Sidney Lumet's all-star Murder on the Orient Express (1974), based on the Agatha Christie whodunit, for which he was nominated for an Academy Award for Best Adapted Screenplay.

Dehn resurrected or reinvented at least three genres given up for dead at the time; the British mystery, the Shakespeare adaptation, and the spy film.

Screenplays
 Seven Days to Noon (1950)
 Waters of Time (1951) (documentary)
 On Such a Night (1956)
 Orders to Kill (1958)
ITV Play of the Week - adaptation of A Woman of No Importance (1960)
A Place for Gold (1960) (documentary)  
 Goldfinger (1964)
 The Spy Who Came in from the Cold (1965)
 The Deadly Affair (1967)
The Night of the Generals (1967)
 The Taming of the Shrew (1967)
 Beryl Reid Says Good Evening (1968)
 Beneath the Planet of the Apes (1970)
 Fragment of Fear (1970) - also associate producer
 Escape from the Planet of the Apes (1971)
 Conquest of the Planet of the Apes (1972)
 Battle for the Planet of the Apes (1973)
 Murder on the Orient Express (1974)

Awards and nominations
 Academy Award for 'Writing, (Motion Picture Story)', 1952 for Seven Days to Noon
 BAFTA Award Nomination for Best British Screenplay, 1959
 Edgar Allan Poe Award for Best American Film, 1965
 Writers Guild of America Award Nomination for Best American Drama, 1966
 Edgar Allan Poe Award for Best Motion Picture, 1966
 BAFTA Award Nomination for Best British Screenplay, 1968
 Edgar Allan Poe Award Nomination for Best Motion Picture, 1974
 Writers Guild of Britain Award for Best British Screenplay, 1974
 Academy Award Nomination for Best Adapted Screenplay, 1975

References

External links

 http://theoscarsite.com/whoswho3/dehn_p.htm
 The New York Times Movies
 Archival Material at 

1912 births
1976 deaths
20th-century English male writers
20th-century English screenwriters
Best British Screenplay BAFTA Award winners
Best Story Academy Award winners
Alumni of Brasenose College, Oxford
Edgar Award winners
English male screenwriters
British gay writers
People educated at Shrewsbury School
English opera librettists
Writers from Manchester
20th-century English dramatists and playwrights
English male dramatists and playwrights
British Special Operations Executive personnel
20th-century English LGBT people